Myrtle Bank is a suburb of Adelaide, South Australia in the City of Unley. The suburb is named after a property near the foothills built in 1842 by William Sanders (1801–1880), who arrived in South Australia in 1838. He named the premises 'Myrtle Bank', because his friend James Gall of Trinity living in Edinburgh had a fine property of the same name. The property passed through the hands of Capt. William Elder, brother of Sir Thomas Elder, before being purchased in 1848 by William Ferguson (1809–1892), who built on the original house and lived there with his family until he died.

During World War I the property became a repatriation hospital.

References

Suburbs of Adelaide